Omegatetravirus is a genus of viruses, in the family Alphatetraviridae. Moths and  butterflies serve as natural hosts. There are three species in this genus. Infection outcome varies from unapparent to lethal.

Taxonomy
The following species are assigned to the genus:
Dendrolimus punctatus virus
Helicoverpa armigera stunt virus
Nudaurelia capensis omega virus

Structure
Viruses in Omegatetravirus are non-enveloped, with icosahedral geometries, and T=4 symmetry. The diameter is around 40 nm. Genomes are linear and bipartite, around 2.5kb in length.

Life cycle
Viral replication is cytoplasmic. Entry into the host cell is achieved by penetration into the host cell. Replication follows the positive stranded RNA virus replication model. Positive stranded RNA virus transcription is the method of transcription. Translation takes place by leaky scanning. Moths and  butterflies serve as the natural host. Transmission routes are oral.

References

External links
 Viralzone: Omegatetravirus
 ICTV

Alphatetraviridae
Virus genera